The first French reality TV show La Ferme Célébrités, season was broadcast between 10 April 2004 and 18 June 2004 on TF1. It was presented by Christophe Dechavanne and Patrice Carmouze. Won by Pascal Olmeta who won €180,000 for the association "Williams in Corsica" of the Williams syndrome research.

Contestant

Nominations

References

La Ferme Célébrités
2004 French television seasons